Anteater (The Anteater in Britain, Ameisenbär in Germany) is an arcade video game designed by Chris Oberth and released in 1982 by Tago Electronics. The player steers the tongue of the eponymous creature through a maze, retracting it when dangers approach. Though the arcade game was not a hit, it spawned a number of direct clones for home computers; Sierra's Oils Well became better known than the original. Oberth wrote an Apple II version of his own game for Datamost using a different title.

Gameplay

The player controls an anteater that elongates its tongue through a maze-like ant colony in search of ants. Only the tip of the tongue can eat an ant. If an ant touches any other part of the tongue, then the player loses a life. Pressing the second button quickly retracts the anteater's tongue.

Worms can only be eaten from behind. Eating queen ants at the very bottom of the nest temporarily removes all ants and worms from the screen. Once the sun has traveled across the screen and night falls, a spider appears. The spider climbs down the anteater's tongue, taking a life if it reaches the tip.

The object is to eat all of the larvae before time runs out, clearing the screen. Each larva is worth 10 points. Each ant is worth 100 points, while eating a worm is worth 200. Queen ants are worth 1,000. After losing a life or finishing a level, a bonus of 10 points for each ant eaten is multiplied by the number of worms eaten (for example, eating 5 ants and 2 worms = 50 x 2 = 100).

Music
Between levels, Anteater plays "In the Hall of the Mountain King".

At the start of each level, the music played is a short fragment of Ranz des Vaches, the third movement of William Tell Overture.

Ports
The game was ported to the Atari 2600 by Mattel in 1983 but never published. No official ports were released but Datamost's Ardy The Aardvark (1983), which is almost identical, was written for the Apple II by Anteater creator Chris Oberth. That game was converted to the Commodore 64 and Atari 8-bit family by Jay Ford.

Reception

Legacy
Sierra's 1983 home clone, Oil's Well, was re-themed to be about drilling for oil and was heavily promoted. It sparked its own clones: Pipeline Run for the C64 in 1990 and Oilmania for the Atari ST in 1991. Other clones of Anteater are Bug-Byte’s Aardvark (1986), Jack the Digger (1986) for the Atari 8-bit family, and Blue Ribbon's Diamond Mine (1984) and Diamond Mine II (1985).

The current arcade high score holder is Maria Blasucci.

References

External links

Anteater at Arcade History

1982 video games
Stern video games
Arcade video games
Arcade-only video games
Maze games
Cancelled Atari 2600 games
Fictional sloths and anteaters
Video games about insects
Video games developed in the United States
Multiplayer and single-player video games
Video games about ants